Lorenzo Giustino (born 10 September 1991, in Naples) is an Italian tennis player.

Giustino has a career-high ATP singles ranking of 127 achieved on 12 August 2019 and a career-high ATP doubles ranking of 311 achieved on 15 April 2019.

Giustino made his ATP main draw debut at the 2015 BRD Năstase Țiriac Trophy, where he qualified for the main draw.

Giustino defeated Frenchman Corentin Moutet 0–6, 7–6 (7), 7–6 (3), 2–6, 18–16 in the first round of 2020 French Open. The match was the second-longest in French Open history, lasting 6 hours, 5 minutes.

Challenger and Futures finals

Singles: 21 (10–11)

Doubles: 6 (3–3)

References

External links
 
 

1991 births
Living people
Italian male tennis players
Tennis players from Naples
21st-century Italian people